Seyyed Nazar (also Romanized as Seyyed Naz̧ar; also known as Seyyed Nāşer) is a village in Margha Rural District, in the Central District of Izeh County, Khuzestan Province, Iran. At the 2006 census, its population was 18, in 4 families.

References 

Populated places in Izeh County